Ciqu Station is an interchange station on the Yizhuang line and Line 17 of the Beijing Subway. It opened on December 30, 2010, together with the other stations on the Yizhuang line. The station was the terminus of the Yizhuang line until December 30, 2018. Line 17 opened on December 31, 2021.

Station Layout 
Both Yizhuang line and line 17 stations have underground island platforms.

Exits 
There are 5 exits, lettered A, B, D, F and H. Exit A is accessible via an elevator.

Gallery

References

External links

Beijing Subway stations in Tongzhou District
Railway stations in China opened in 2010